Bonita Lynn Tholl (born June 30, 1969) is a former American softball player, who is currently the head coach for the Michigan Wolverines softball team.

Softball player
After graduating from Victor J. Andrew High School in Tinley Park, Illinois, Tholl played softball at the University of Michigan and started at the position Shortstop from 1988–1991. She led the team in runs for three straight years from 1989-1991 and she also led the team in walks for three seasons (1988, 1989, 1991). She also shares the Big Ten record for fewest strikeouts in a conference season with zero in 1991. She is the University of Michigan record holder for most stolen bases in a game with 4 stolen bases against FAMU in 1990. She was the captain of the team and received the 1991 Maize and Blue Award.

Tholl was the first player in the Big Ten to earn All-Big Ten first team honors four times. She was named part of the Big Ten All-Decade (1982-1992) softball team.

Tholl graduated from the University of Michigan with a degree in sports management and communications in 1991. She also has a Master of Science degree in athletic administration from Indiana Hoosiers from 1993.

Coaching career
On August 28, 2002, Tholl was promoted to the associate head coach for the Michigan Wolverines softball team. Tholl helped lead the 2005 Michigan Wolverines softball team to their first Women's College World Series in 2005.

On August 24, 2022, following the retirement of long-time head coach Carol Hutchins, Tholl was promoted to head coach.

Head coaching record

College

References

External links
 University of Michigan profile

1969 births
Living people
Softball coaches from Illinois
Female sports coaches
American softball coaches
Michigan Wolverines softball players
Michigan Wolverines softball coaches
People from Tinley Park, Illinois
Sportspeople from Cook County, Illinois
Softball players from Illinois